The James Scales House, built c. 1885 in Kirkland, Tennessee, United States, along with the William W. Johnson House, another Williamson County house, are notable as late 19th century central passage plan residences that "display period decoration at eaves and porch."  It includes Stick/Eastlake, I-house, and central passage plan architecture.

It was listed on the National Register of Historic Places in 1988.

See also
Joseph Scales House, Triune, Tennessee, also NRHP-listed in Williamson County
Absalom Scales House, Eagleville, Tennessee, also NRHP-listed

References

Central-passage houses in Tennessee
Houses completed in 1885
Houses on the National Register of Historic Places in Tennessee
Houses in Williamson County, Tennessee
Victorian architecture in Tennessee
National Register of Historic Places in Williamson County, Tennessee